Someday World is a collaboration album by British musician Brian Eno and Karl Hyde, of British electronic group Underworld, released on 5 May 2014. The album features a number of supporting musicians, including Coldplay's Will Champion, John Reynolds and Andy Mackay of Roxy Music, and was produced by Brian Eno with 20-year-old Fred Gibson. It was followed two months later by the album High Life.

Background

It was Eno's first album since Lux in 2012 and his first collaboration album since Drums Between the Bells with Rick Holland in 2011. It is also Hyde's second album after Edgeland in 2013, which Eno contributed a remix to. Eno previously worked with Karl Hyde in 2009 as part of Pure Scenius, and in 2011 collaborated with Underworld on the track "Beebop Hurry".

Reception

Someday World has received positive reviews from music critics. At Metacritic, which assigns a normalized rating out of 100 to reviews from mainstream critics, the album has received an average score of 62, based on 26 reviews, which indicates "generally favorable reviews".

Track listing
"The Satellites" – 5:33
"Daddy's Car" – 4:50
"A Man Wakes Up" – 4:17
"Witness" – 5:06
"Strip It Down" – 4:43
"Mother of a Dog" – 5:37
"Who Rings the Bell" – 5:05
"When I Built This World" – 5:44
"To Us All" – 3:28

Special Edition 2CD Disc 2
"Big Band Song"
"Brazil 3"
"Celebration"
"Titian Bekh"

Personnel
Brian Eno – artwork, production, brass, piano, synthesizer, keyboards, bass, guitar, program drums, drums, vocals, background vocals
Karl Hyde – cover photograph, guitar, vocals, harmonica, tambourine, piano, synthesizer, talking drum, background vocals
Additional musicians and production staff

Chart positions

References

External links
Eno • Hyde homepage

2014 albums
Albums produced by Brian Eno
Brian Eno albums
Collaborative albums
Warp (record label) albums
Albums produced by Fred Again